Robert Brieger (born 21 November 1956) is a General of the Austrian Armed Forces and the current Chairman of the European Union Military Committee (CEUMC). Brieger was previously the Chief of its General Staff. On 19 May 2021, Brieger was selected as the next CEUMC, and selected to take office on 1 June 2022. He took office 16 May 2022.

References 
 

1956 births
Living people
Military personnel from Vienna
Austrian generals
Theresian Military Academy alumni
Recipients of the Decoration of Honour for Services to the Republic of Austria